HMS Vesper was a V-class destroyer of the British Royal Navy that saw service in World War I and World War II.

Construction and commissioning

Vesper, the first Royal Navy ship of the name, was ordered on 30 June 1916 as part of the 9th Order of the 1916–17 Naval Programme. She was laid down on 7 December 1916 by Stephen's of Govan, Glasgow, and launched on 15 December 1917. She was completed on 20 February 1918.

Service history

World War I
Vesper joined the fleet for service during World War I, and remained in service after the 11 November 1918 Armistice with Germany that ended the war, but later was decommissioned and placed in reserve.

World War II

1939-1942
Vesper was recommissioned in 1939. After the United Kingdom entered World War II in September 1939, she was assigned to convoy defence and patrol duties in the Southwestern Approaches through December 1939.  From January through April 1940, she performed similar duties in the English Channel and North Sea. On 14 February 1940 she and the destroyer  rescued 72 survivors of the British merchant ship Sultan Star, which the German submarine  had sunk southwest of the Scilly Isles at position .

In May 1940, Vesper was deployed with the 19th Destroyer Flotilla to Harwich, England, and assigned to the support of the evacuation of troops from France. On 10 May 1940 she carried a demolition party to Ymuiden in the Netherlands in Operation XD to destroy oil tanks there to prevent their capture by advancing German Army forces, and on 14 May 1940 she took part in Operation Ordnance, the evacuation of forces from the Hook of Holland. During June 1940, deployed with her destroyer flotilla to Dover and provided gunfire support to the retreating British Expeditionary Force at Le Tréport, France.

Vesper was reassigned to the 21st Destroyer Flotilla at Sheerness in July 1940 for anti-invasion patrol and convoy escort duties in the English Channel and North Sea, which she continued until December 1940. She and the destroyer  rescued 111 survivors of the British merchant ship Beignon, which the German submarine  had sunk 300 nautical miles west of Ushant at position . On 13 September 1940 she joined the destroyer leader  and escort destroyer  in an anti-invasion patrol off the coast of the Netherlands and to bombard Ostend, Belgium, but poor visibility prompted cancellation of the bombardment. On 8 October 1940 she towed the escort destroyer  to safety at Sheerness after Hambledon detonated a naval mine in the English Channel off South Foreland at position  and suffered severe damage.

In December 1940, Vesper was assigned to duty in the Western Approaches and steamed to the River Clyde. The three ships detached from the convoy on 21 December 1940 and returned to the Clyde. For the next two years, Vesper continued her duties in the Western Approaches. On 19 June 1941, she towed the destroyer  to safety after Vanessa suffered heavy damage from a bomb hit amidships while under attack by German aircraft and collided with the naval trawler . Vesper herself collided with the destroyer  on 31 August 1942.

1943-1945
In December 1942, the Royal Navy selected Vesper for conversion to a "long-range escort," which was completed in mid-1943. After passing her post-conversion acceptance trials, she steamed to Tobermory, Isle of Mull, in August 1943 for work-ups. In September 1943 she joined the 2nd Escort Group for convoy escort duty in the North Atlantic Ocean, which she carried out until January 1944, when she was transferred to the 6th Escort Group for convoy escort work in the Western Approaches.

In April 1944, Vesper was chosen to take part  in Operation Neptune, the assault phase of the upcoming invasion of Normandy, scheduled for early June 1944, as a part of  Escort Group 112 in Western Task Force O. She joined Force O in May 1944 and participated in pre-invasion exercises that month. In early June 1944 she joined the other ships of Force O at Portland, England, and on 5 and 6 June deployed to defend convoys bound for the 6 June assault at Omaha Beach. From 8 June 1944 she operated from the assembly area at Milford Haven, Wales, in the defense of convoys transporting reinforcements and supplies to the beachhead until Operation Neptune came to an end in the latter part of June 1944.

Vesper served on convoy escort duty in the English Channel from July through September 1944, then operated on convoy defense duties in waters around the British Isles until the surrender of Germany in early May 1945.

During the Second World War Vesper was adopted by the town of Skipton as part of Warship Week.  The plaque from this adoption is held by the National Museum of the Royal Navy in Portsmouth.

Decommissioning and disposal
After Germanys surrender, Vesper did not deploy operationally, and she soon was decommissioned and placed in reserve, being no longer included on the Royal Navys July 1945 active list. She was sold to BISCO on 7 March 1947 for scrapping by Thos. W. Ward, and arrived at the shipbreakers yard in March 1948.

Notes

Bibliography

External links
 Naval History: HMS VESPER (D 55) -  V & W-class Destroyer
 uboat.net HMS Vesper (D 55)

 

V and W-class destroyers of the Royal Navy
Ships built on the River Clyde
1917 ships
World War I destroyers of the United Kingdom
World War II destroyers of the United Kingdom
Maritime incidents in August 1942